ACF Fiorentina had a fantastic season points-wise, scoring just a couple of points less than second-positioned Roma, but due a 15-point penalty because of the club's involvement in the Calciopoli scandal, it missed out on the Champions League, and had to settle for 6th and a position in the 2007–08 UEFA Cup. New signing Adrian Mutu was able to compensate for Luca Toni not having such a spectacular season as the one before, and both players netted 16 goals. Goalkeeper Sébastien Frey also had a top-class season, conceding only 31 goals all year, despite having a defensive line without renowned stoppers.

Players

Goalkeepers
  Sébastien Frey
  Bogdan Lobonț
  Vlada Avramov
  Cristiano Lupatelli

Defenders
  Per Krøldrup
  Dario Dainelli
  Alessandro Gamberini
  Alessandro Potenza
  Alex
  Tomáš Ujfaluši
  Manuel Pasqual
  Massimiliano Tagliani
  Davide Brivio
  Andrea Pierro

Midfielders
  Marco Donadel
  Guly do Prado
  Michele Pazienza
  Fabio Liverani
  Andrea Paolucci
  Manuele Blasi
  Riccardo Montolivo
  Massimo Gobbi
  Martin Jørgensen
  Zdravko Kuzmanović
  Danilo D'Ambrosio
  Filipe
  Mario Santana

Forwards
  Christian Riganò
  Adrian Mutu
  Luca Toni
  Samuel Di Carmine
  Giampaolo Pazzini
  Matthias Lepiller
  Reginaldo

Competitions

Overall

Last updated: 27 May 2007

Serie A

League table

Results summary

Results by round

Matches

Coppa Italia

References

ACF Fiorentina seasons
Fiorentina